Whiteside is an English surname. Notable people with the surname include:

Abby Whiteside (1881–1956), American piano teacher
Alan Whiteside (born 1956), South African HIV/AIDS researcher and author
Andra Whiteside (born 1989), Fijian badminton player
Arnold Whiteside (1911–1994), English footballer
Bernard Whiteside (born 1954), British diplomat
Catharine Whiteside, Canadian physician and medical researcher
Charles Mitchell Whiteside (1854-1924), American businessman and politician
Chase Whiteside (born 1988), American journalist and filmmaker
Chris Whiteside (1953-2022), English cricketer
Dale Whiteside (1930–2021), American politician
David Whiteside (1870–1947), Canadian politician
Don Whiteside (1931-1993), Canadian-American sociologist, author, and civil servant
Donald Whiteside (born 1969), American basketball player
Eli Whiteside (born 1979), American baseball player
Eric Whiteside (1904–1997), Indian sprinter
Ernie Whiteside (1889–1953), English footballer
Frank H. Whiteside (1873–1916), Canadian politician
George Whiteside (1902–1976), Australian politician
Hassan Whiteside (born 1989), American basketball player
Horace Whiteside (1891–1956), American football player and coach
J. J. Arcega-Whiteside (born 1996), American football player
James Whiteside (1804–1876), Irish judge and politician
James B. Whiteside (born 1984), American ballet dancer
Jane Whiteside (1855–1875), New Zealand tightrope dancer, gymnast, and magician
Jenkin Whiteside (1772–1822), American attorney and politician
Jennifer Whiteside, Canadian politician
Jim Whiteside (1924–2019), American politician
John Whiteside (1773–1830), American politician
John Whiteside (cricketer) (1861–1946), English cricketer
Joseph Whiteside (1906–1990), English swimmer
Ken Whiteside (born 1929), English professional footballer
Kerr Whiteside (1884–1919), Scottish footballer
Keyon Whiteside (born 1980), American football player
Larry Whiteside (1937–2007), American sports journalist
Lisa Whiteside (born 1985), British amateur boxer
Matt Whiteside (born 1967), American baseball player
Matthew Whiteside (born 1988), Northern Irish composer
Ninian E. Whiteside (1812–1876), American politician, attorney, and pioneer
Noel Whiteside (1903–1948), British businessman and politician
Norman Whiteside (born 1965), Northern Irish footballer
Peter Whiteside (1952–2020), British pentathlete
Peter Whiteside (politician) (1870–1929), Australian-born South African trade union leader and politician
Ray Whiteside (born 1932), Indian-born Australian field hockey player
Robert Whiteside (1950–2006), American artist and craftsman
Roger Whiteside (born 1958), British businessman
Samuel Whiteside (1783–1868), American pioneer and politician
Sean Whiteside (born 1971), American baseball player
Shaun Whiteside (born 1959), Northern Irish translator
Thomas Whiteside (disambiguation), multiple people including:
Thomas Whiteside (bishop) (1857–1921), English Roman Catholic bishop
Thomas Whiteside (journalist) (1918–1997), American journalist
Tom Whiteside (1932–2008), British historian of mathematics
Walker Whiteside (1869–1942), American actor
Warren Whiteside (born 1961), Australian cricketer

See also
Whitesides

English-language surnames